Ben Vorlich, meaning Hill of the bay in Gaelic, is a common name, applied to several hills in different parts of Scotland:

Ben Vorlich (Loch Earn), 985 m Munro and Marilyn lying south of Loch Earn
Ben Vorlich, Loch Lomond, 943 m Munro and Marilyn on the western side of Loch Lomond in the Arrochar Alps